This list of tallest buildings in Minnesota ranks skyscrapers in the state of Minnesota by tallest height of high rise. This does not include antennas, although the tallest overall man-made structure in Minnesota is the KPXM-TV Tower in Big Lake. It is also the 212th tallest structure in the us. The majority of the tallest buildings in Minnesota are in Minneapolis, the largest city in the state by population. Other cities that have some of the state's tallest buildings include the state capital of St. Paul (14), South St. Paul (1), Rochester (11), Golden Valley (4), St. Louis Park (7), Plymouth (1), Duluth (6), Brooklyn Center (1), St. Cloud (2), Edina (9), Maplewood (1), Robbinsdale (1), Eden Prairie (4), Moorhead (2), Richfield (4), Eagan (2), and Bloomington (15). Not all buildings in Minneapolis and St. Paul are listed, due to the large number of skyscrapers and high rises in both cities.

List

Tallest buildings under construction

Tallest buildings proposed

Tallest buildings approved

See also
 List of tallest buildings in Minneapolis
 List of tallest buildings in St. Paul
 List of tallest buildings in Rochester, Minnesota

References

Sources
Emporis - Minneapolis
Emporis - St. Paul
Emporis - Rochester
Emporis - Bloomington
Emporis - Duluth
Emporis - Edina
Emporis - St. Louis Park
Emporis - Golden Valley
Emporis - Richfield
Emporis - Brooklyn Center
Emporis - Moorhead
Emporis - Maplewood
Emporis - Eden Prairie
Emporis - South St. Paul
Emporis - Mankato
Emporis - Red Wing
Emporis - Robbinsdale
Emporis - Bemidji
Emporis - Alexandria

 
Minnesota
Lists of buildings and structures in Minnesota